Jeffrey Watson is a Canadian actor. He was nominated for "Best Performance by an Alberta Actor" in the 2007 Alberta Film & Television Awards for his part in Dinosapien. He has done voice acting work in several anime dubs and video games for Calgary-based Blue Water Studios.

Voice roles

Anime
 Cardfight!! Vanguard - Izaki
 D.I.C.E. - Jet Siegel
 Doki Doki School Hours - Kenta Suetake
 Dragon Ball - Goku (Teen)
 Dragon Ball GT - Dende
 Fancy Lala - Taro Yoshida
 Full Moon o Sagashite - Takuto Kira
 The Law of Ueki - Kageo Kuroki
 Mobile Fighter G Gundam - Hoi

Western animation
 The Wheelers - Max
 Mysteries and Feluda - Flash

Video games
 DNA Integrated Cybernetic Enterprises - Additional Voices
 Dynasty Warriors Gundam 3 - Garrod Ran
 Mega Man X8 - Axl
 Mega Man X: Command Mission - Axl, Additional Voices
 Mega Man Battle Network 5: Double Team DS - MegaMan.EXE

Live action roles

 Dinosapien - Chris Langhorn

References

External links

Jeffrey Watson at the CrystalAcids Anime Voice Actor Database

Place of birth missing (living people)
Year of birth missing (living people)
Canadian male video game actors
Canadian male voice actors
Living people